The 2020 Taiwan Football Challenge League is the first year of men's second division football in Taiwan.

The top team from the Second Division league is automatically promoted to the Taiwan Premier League and the lowest placed team in the Taiwan Premier League is relegated to the Second Division League. The runner-up of the Second Division League will play in a qualification play-off final with the 7th places team in the Taiwan Premier League, which results in the winner playing in the first Division. Similarly, the 7th and 8th placed teams in Second Division will play a qualification tournament with the 1st and 2nd teams from the Challengers tournament which the top two teams stay in Second Division.

Clubs

Currently there are 8 teams competing in this league. The league has implemented a promotion and relegation system.

League table

References

Taiwan Second Division Football League
Professional sports leagues in Taiwan